Wisconsin v. Illinois, 278 U.S. 367 (1929), also referred to as the Chicago Sanitary District Case, is an opinion of the Supreme Court of the United States which held that the equitable power of the United States can be used to impose positive action on one state in a situation in which nonaction would result in damage to the interests of other states. Pursuant to Article Three of the United States Constitution, the case was heard under the Supreme Court's original jurisdiction (i.e. it did not come to the Supreme Court from a lower court) because it involved a controversy between two states, Illinois and Wisconsin). Chief Justice William Howard Taft wrote the opinion for a unanimous Court.

The case
The city of Chicago increasingly was diverting Great Lakes waters to carry off sewage through a long-established drainage canal, the Chicago Sanitary and Ship Canal. Illinois claimed that these increasing amounts of diverted water were made necessary by Chicago's growth.  Wisconsin, however, claimed that the diversion was lowering lake levels, thereby impairing its transportation facilities and abilities. 

After exhaustive hearings, a special master was assigned by the Supreme Court of the United States to consider the facts of the case fixed maximum diversion at a point below that necessary for continued utilization of the drainage canal system alone, thereby requiring the construction of sewage disposal works, but the City of Chicago and the State of Illinois procrastinated. The State of Illinois excepted to the special master's findings, and the Supreme Court heard the case en banc over two days in April 1928.  

Chief Justice Taft's opinion for the Court finally settled the question of the authority of the United States to intervene to enforce action by a state in such a situation. He wrote, "In deciding the controversy between States, the authority of the Court to enjoin the continued perpetration of the wrong inflicted on the complainants, necessarily embraces the authority to require measures to be taken to end the conditions, within the control of the defendant state, which may stand in the way of the execution of the decree." This quote is not from the actual opinion of the case.

The Court entered its decree shortly thereafter.

References

Further reading
 James Truslow Adams, Dictionary of American History, New York: Charles Scribner's Sons, 1940

External links 

 

United States Supreme Court cases
United States Supreme Court cases of the Taft Court
1929 in United States case law
United States Supreme Court original jurisdiction cases
1929 in the environment
1929 in Wisconsin
1929 in Illinois
Lake Michigan
Water supply and sanitation in the United States
United States Constitution Article Three case law